John Bard Manulis (born September 8, 1956) is an American film, television and theater producer, director, entrepreneur and activist. He has produced or executive produced more than 20 films, television programs, and theater productions, including Charlotte Sometimes, The Basketball Diaries, Swing Kids, Arctic Tale, Foxfire, HBO's Blindside, and The Umbilical Brothers: THWAK.

Manulis has been noted for creating a body of work over the course of his career that integrates social and political themes within popular entertainment, including these: drug addiction (The Basketball Diaries); repression and rebellion (Swing Kids); AIDS, individual freedom, and biracial relationships (Daybreak); the Vietnam War (Intimate Strangers); positive Latino role models (Tortilla Soup); female empowerment (Foxfire, V.I. Warshawski); poverty (American Idol Gives Back) and climate change/environmental consciousness (Arctic Tale).

Early life and education 
Manulis was born in Los Angeles to actress Katharine Bard and Martin Manulis; his father is a film, television, and theater producer best known as the creator of the television program, Playhouse 90.

He attended Harvard College after his preparatory school education at Harvard School, in North Hollywood, California.

Manulis graduated from Harvard with a Bachelor of Arts in English and American Literature and Language. He was president of the Harvard Dramatic Club, and directed numerous productions, including the musical Two Gentleman of Verona, by John Guare and Galt MacDermot, which he independently produced and presented outdoors in Harvard Yard, and a multimedia adaptation of U.S.A. by John Dos Passos on the Loeb Mainstage.

During summer breaks, Manulis worked on films, most notably as a production assistant on All The President's Men and as assistant art director on Lee Grant's Academy Award nominee The Stranger.

Career

Theater 
After graduating from Harvard, Manulis moved to New York, where he began his professional career as Marshall W. Mason's assistant at the renowned Circle Repertory Company. Promoted to casting director in 1980, he continued to work with Mason, co-directing John Bishop's The Great Grandson of Jedediah Kohler and assistant directing Lanford Wilson's Pulitzer Prize-winning trilogy, Talley's Folly, Fifth of July and A Tale Told; Hamlet, starring William Hurt, and Murder at the Howard Johnson's, which was produced on Broadway. He directed workshop productions at Circle Rep, Playwrights Horizons, and Manhattan Theatre Club. In addition, Manulis directed Marjorie Appleman's Seduction Duet, which starred Jeff Daniels and won the 1981 Samuel French One-Act Festival.

Manulis has also produced several plays, including 1988's Three Ways Home at the Astor Place Theater in New York, and The Umbilical Brothers: THWAK, which was produced in 1999/2000 at Off-Broadway's Minetta Lane Theatre and at the Tiffany Theater in Los Angeles

In 1979, Manulis was chosen by Arthur Penn, Elia Kazan and Joseph Mankiewicz to become a Founding Member of the Actors Studio Playwrights and Directors Unit.

Film and television
In 1983, Manulis joined the Nederlander Organization, where he brought projects through development and production as an executive producer in their newly formed television and film division.   While at Nederlander, Manulis was involved with producing properties ranging from the ACE Award-winning A Case of Libel, starring Daniel J. Travanti and Ed Asner, to Intimate Strangers, a television movie starring Teri Garr and Stacy Keach. He created the Comedy Zone, a weekly one-hour series on CBS, which brought together writers and actors such as Neil Simon, Kathleen Turner, Wendy Wasserstein, Joe Mantegna, Jules Feiffer and Christopher Durang.

Manulis went on to serve as Vice President of Film for Edgar Scherick Associates, Senior VP of Production for Jeffrey Lurie's Chestnut Hill Productions, and Head of Worldwide Production and Acquisition for Samuel Goldwyn Films, where he supervised the production or acquisition of films such as The Madness of King George, Lolita, American Buffalo, I Shot Andy Warhol, Welcome to Woop Woop, Bent and Tortilla Soup.

Live events
In 2008, Manulis produced the campaign events involving local, regional and national surrogates for Barack Obama's Campaign for Change in Colorado. He produced the short filmmaking competitions for Microsoft's Imagine Cup in both Brazil (2004) and Japan (2005), and the Liberty Hill Foundation's annual Upton Sinclair Award dinner (2003, 2004, 2005). With Gary Sinise, he directed the Directors Guild of America's memorial tribute to the life of director John Frankenheimer.

Digital media and technology
Manulis co-founded Visionbox Media Group, a production, post-production and distribution consulting company using digital technology to produce and distribute films and television content in 2000, before digital technology became ubiquitous in film and television. "Definitions are changing on everything, even what the word 'digital' means", Manulis said in a 2002 interview with the Los Angeles Times. "There are so many technologies that are encompassed in that one word....The one thing everyone agrees on is that 'digital' equals change."

Manulis is the CEO of Screenspaces, a social technology company he founded with his wife, Liz Heller, in 2011. Screenspace's inaugural product offering was the Vwalls social publishing platform.

Activism and philanthropy 
Manulis, who was recognized by the Los Angeles County Board of Supervisors as one of their 2012 Leaders To Watch, is a lifelong philanthropist and activist. He serves on the board of directors for The Getty House Foundation, and on the board of the Liberty Hill Foundation.  Manulis and his wife, Liz Heller, received the Liberty Hill Founder's Award in 2010.

Credits

References

External links 
 
 
 Vwalls

Film producers from California
American theatre directors
American theatre managers and producers
Businesspeople from Los Angeles
American television executives
Harvard College alumni
1956 births
Living people
Harvard-Westlake School alumni